Co-living is a residential community living model that accommodates three or more biologically unrelated people living in the same dwelling unit. Generally coliving is a type of intentional community that provides shared housing for people with similar values or intentions. The coliving experience may simply include group discussions in common areas or weekly meals, although will oftentimes extend to shared workspace and collective endeavors such as living more sustainably. An increasing number of people across the world are turning to coliving in order to unlock the same benefits as other communal living models (such as communes or cohousing), including "comfort, affordability, and a greater sense of social belonging."

Coliving as a modern concept traces its origins to shared living models of the 19th and 20th centuries such as tenements in the UK, boarding houses in the US, and chawls in western India, yet ancient forms of communal living such as the longhouse date back thousands of years. Its contemporary form has gained prominence in recent years due to a combination of factors including increased urbanization rates, a lack of affordable housing options, greater rates of disability requiring group home or assisted living arrangements, and a growing interest in lifestyles not dependent upon long-term contracts.

Individual benefits 
For the individual, living in a coliving community provides many advantages as compared to traditional living options. While the benefits are many, the most common benefits include community, convenience, cost savings, and comfort.

Community 
The vast majority of coliving companies around the world claim that community is the number one benefit they provide their residents. Coliving companies promise their residents a thoughtful, community-driven living experience that will lead to meaningful relationships. One of the trends that has increased the demand for the community is the loneliness epidemic that has been identified by researchers in countries around the world. Studies have shown that "loneliness is just as lethal as smoking 15 cigarettes per day" and "lonely people are 50% more likely to die prematurely than those with healthy social relationships."

Studies show that daily social interactions, such as those common in  coliving communities, can actually "improve health and increase longevity." Early evidence from coliving operators highlights the benefit of community. Venn, an Israeli coliving operator with locations in Israel, Germany, and the US, found that "loneliness levels drop by 50% just 6 months after joining Venn" and "100% of members feel they are socially supported."

Convenience 
The convenience benefit of coliving comes namely from flexible lease terms and a customer-centric business model. Instead of only offering twelve-month leases, many coliving operators offer shorter lease terms of three or six months that better suit the dynamic lifestyles of their tenants. In fact, an increasing number of coliving locations are starting to offer month-by-month rental agreements as well as the option to not pay a traditional deposit. As a differentiation strategy, coliving operators also aim to remove the many frictions of the traditional living experience such as buying and moving furniture, finding roommates, or paying separate utility bills. By providing fully furnished rooms, offering roommate matching, and including utilities in a single rent price, coliving operators create a convenient living experience "so all you need to do upon arrival is unpack your suitcase."

Cost savings 
Another potential benefit of coliving is relatively affordable rent when compared to traditional living environments in the same area. Coliving operators decrease costs for their residents in two main ways. First, many coliving operators bundle their product offering to include a variety of services for one, all-inclusive price. Instead of paying separate bills for utilities, furniture, wifi, gym access, cleaning services, and amenities (such as paper towels, linens, or coffee), coliving residents pay one bill each month that comes at a discount compared to paying for all the services individually. Second, many coliving operators utilize higher density spatial design models to decrease the amount of rent paid by each resident. By operating four or six-bedroom units instead of studios or two-bedroom units, "the rent per square foot of a co-living unit will be much higher than that of a traditional multifamily unit."

Types 
All modern coliving concepts are in one way or another a form of communal living, yet people from across the world have developed different types of coliving. Coliving communities can vary on a wide variety of characteristics including length of stay, building type, community size, and resident demographics. For example, many urban coliving spaces have upwards of 100 residents, cater their offering to young professionals, and only offer leases longer than six months. Rural coliving spaces may exist in a five-bedroom house, are popular amongst digital nomads, and allow residents to rent on a month-to-month basis.

Cost conscious 
The cost-conscious category of coliving is oriented towards cost-conscious residents that are oftentimes priced out of large cities. With home prices outpacing wage growth in 80% of U.S. markets, an increasing number of people are looking for affordable living options within large urban areas. Many coliving operators have seized the opportunity to provide a relatively more affordable living experience centered around community. Operators such as Haven Coliving in Los Angeles, Outpost-Club in New York, or The Student Hotel in Europe have a shared room offering (along with single rooms) where two to four residents will stay in the same room. Due to the increase in density, potential residents can expect to pay far less than renting a studio in the same city.

Physically
Coliving is similar to single room occupancy as it offers residents an individual space in a shared property. Most typically a private room with an ensuite bathroom; however, shared bathrooms are not uncommon and at lower prices, spaces have dormitories in the same manner as a hostel. Spaces may simultaneously offer many of these types of individual space thus providing for multiple budgets and types of residents.

The defining characteristic is that all coliving spaces offer at least a shared kitchen and living room in the same manner as in a flatshare, yet usually larger and better furnished as coliving spaces focus more on the shared facilities than the individual space.

Some may have a separate workspace whether simply offering desks for online work, or tailored more to their specific residents, such as studios for painting or woodworking. More elaborate and larger spaces may also have cafes, gyms, cinemas, and other amenities.

Philosophically
An aspect of intentional communities that is found, especially in smaller independent coliving spaces, is that of shared values, interests, or purpose in life amongst its residents. Such houses often curate their residents to match these values, so that strong bonds and affinities are built which works to resolve the social isolation often found in entirely independent housing units.

History
Sometime between 1933 and 1934, shared living space was designed in north London called 'Isokon', which was established by Wells Coats. It offered similar amenities, such as a shared communal space, workspace, and things such as a laundry area. It was seen as a part of a greater effort by a greater effort during the intra-war period between World War I and World War II by the Modern Architectural Research Group (MARS) to advance modernist discourse in Britain. Another effort to do this idea was in 1937 by Maxwell Fry (a founding member of MARS) and Elizabeth Denby and was called Kensal House.

Coliving spaces began to emerge in part due to rising property prices. Attempts to establish coliving businesses were made in 2014 and 2015 by companies including 13 and Techsquat, but the attempts failed. Later more successful efforts were made to establish coliving businesses. Relaxations on the minimal rental period for private homes were made in June 2018 from six months to three resulted in a boost for the industry. Cities such as New York City have created incentives for coliving companies to build affordable housing in the city.

Usage
Coliving appeals particularly to millennials due to rising property prices. Residents of coliving spaces typically range between the ages of 19 and 40 years. They are typically employees of startups, entrepreneurs, or students. A survey conducted in various cities in India found that approximately 72% of millennials were willing to consider a coliving space. It also found that 55% of 18–23 year olds were willing to spend R10,000–15,000 per month. Part of the appeal to millennials is due also to a relative reluctance to marry and/or start a family due to cost. High student loan costs are also a factor. From 2005 to 2015, there was a 39% increase for millennials living with housemates. The rise in coliving and similar housing was also impacted by the financial crisis of 2007–2008. Coliving is particularly popular in cities and urban spaces where housing is costly and limited, providing a more affordable and amenity-based alternative to individual apartments. Guests from the same or similar industry tend to be matched together. Per 25 Sep. 2022, there are 1698 coliving operators in the world

Impact
Coliving has grown in popularity in cities such as New York City and London. A Bloomberg article cited "adult dorms" such as coliving facilities as one of the "eight social trends told us about America's economy in 2018."

Author Alexandria Lafci speculated in 2018 that coliving could become ubiquitous in the same way coworking is. She cited both the expectation of 2.5 billion people living in cities by 2050 and 90% of people living on 10% of our land's surface. Hotelier Ian Schrager claimed that coliving spaces were "blurring the distinction between residential and hotels" due in part to differing sensibilities between millennials and previous generations. Author Polly Chu proposed coliving as a potential solution for Hong Kong's housing issues. She said that it could both be done with cross-generational housing – i.e., retrofitting a retirement home to accommodate younger people living with elderly family members – or standard housemates.

Author Matthew Stewart was critical of a specific coliving corporation for "the price, exclusivity, substandard size of bedrooms and cynical view of community." He was also critical of the idea of coliving as a new idea, when he claims that it is a modern, commodified take on a form of living that had a "radical social intent."

Cohousing
Coliving can be considered related to cohousing as the concepts have overlap. Cohousing provides self-contained private units (most often houses), and ownership by the individual unit's resident. In common with coliving, cohousing projects may have shared areas that benefit all such as to be for events or communal meals. Coliving on the other hand is distinguished by having independent units within the same building, and by most often being rented. However, none of these are exclusive, thus the potential overlaps.

References

Housing
Sharing economy